The Ministry of Defence and Veterans Affairs is a ministry of the Government of South Sudan. The incumbent minister is Angelina Teny who assumed the post on 12 March 2020.

References

Defence and Veterans Affairs
South Sudan, Defence and Veterans Affairs
South Sudan
Military of South Sudan